Leslie John "Les" Rusich (9 May 1889 – 21 November 1953) was an Australian rules footballer who played with South Melbourne in the Victorian Football League (VFL).

Rusich, who was of Austrian descent, played his football as a forward. He was in a pocket for South Melbourne in the 1912 VFL Grand Final and kicked the first goal, but finished on the losing team. Rusich also appeared in South Melbourne's 1914 Grand Final loss, as a flanker.

References

External links

1889 births
Australian rules footballers from Victoria (Australia)
Sydney Swans players
Leopold Football Club (MJFA) players
Australian people of Austrian descent
1953 deaths